Like Trees in November is the debut release by Chapter 14. Like Trees in November is a five-song EP self-released on November 30, 2010.

Track listing

References

2010 EPs